Michael "Miki" Siroshtein (born April 25, 1989) is an Israeli association footballer who currently plays for Sektzia Ness Ziona.

Early life
Michael Siroshtein was born in Soviet Ukraine, USSR, and immigrated to Israel in 1990 when he was one year old. His parents divorced after three years, and his father emigrated to Australia.

Career
Siroshtein played in the youth system of Hapoel Ra'anana until 2009. Siroshtein joined the senior team at 2009–10 season, and lost in the final of the Toto Cup to Beitar Jerusalem.

Siroshtein also played for Bnei Yehuda Tel Aviv, and F.C. Ashdod. On June 13, 2017, Siroshtein signed with Beitar Jerusalem for one year.

On 2 July 2019 signed to the Thai League 1 club Suphanburi.

On 8 January 2020 signed to Hapoel Haifa.

References

 

1989 births
Living people
Israeli footballers
Association football defenders
Hapoel Ra'anana A.F.C. players
F.C. Ashdod players
Bnei Yehuda Tel Aviv F.C. players
Beitar Jerusalem F.C. players
Miki Siroshtein
Hapoel Haifa F.C. players
Sektzia Ness Ziona F.C. players
Liga Leumit players
Israeli Premier League players
Miki Siroshtein
Israeli expatriate footballers
Expatriate footballers in Thailand
Israeli expatriate sportspeople in Thailand
Israeli people of Ukrainian-Jewish descent
Soviet emigrants to Israel
Ukrainian emigrants to Israel